Raymond Laquière (10 August 1881, Algiers - 7 August 1973) was a French politician. He represented the Democratic and Social Action in the Chamber of Deputies from 1928 to 1932.

References

1881 births
1973 deaths
People from Algiers
People of French Algeria
Pieds-Noirs
Democratic and Social Action politicians
Members of the 14th Chamber of Deputies of the French Third Republic